Vythiri is a small town and tourist destination located in the Wayanad district in the Indian state of Kerala. It is one of the three Taluks in the district with the other two being Mananthavady and Sulthan Bathery.

Suburbs and villages
Vythiri area has 18 villages. Towns in this taluk include Lakkidi, Vythiri, Chundale, Meppadi, Kalpetta, and Kaniyambetta. Vythiri is the headquarters of Vythiri Taluk.

Tourism
The all season attractive weather, greenery and the terrain of this place makes Vythiri a major tourist destination in Kerala. Tourists from all parts of the world visits and stays in Vythiri to enjoy the beauty of Vythiri and other tourist destinations in Wayanad.

The Chain Tree Legend
According to the local legend, an English engineer built the Ghat road to Vythiri on the basis of the information given by a tribal youth.  After getting the necessary guidance, the English people killed the tribal guide.  The spirit of the tribal youth got angry and caused many accidents in the road.  So a priest took the initiative to chain the spirit to a tree in Vythiri.  This Chain Tree is seen even today at Lakkidi.  Some of the passing motorists even pay homage to the tree for allowing a safe passage.

Altitude
Vythiri is 700 meters above the sea level and the weather is remarkably cooler than other parts of Wayanad.  There are many resorts in Wayanad thanks to the salubrious climate here.

Education
There is a university here specializing in Veterinary science and there is a special college for catering management. Oriental school of hotel management.

Transportation
Vythiri is 66 km by road from Kozhikode railway station and this road includes nine hairpin bends. The nearest major airport is at Calicut. The road to the east connects to Mysore and Bangalore. Night journey is not allowed on this sector as it goes through Bandipur national forest.

Lakkidi Hills
Lakkidi is a small village near Vythiri.  It is situated on the entrance to Wayanad district. There is a hotel management  college. oriental school of hotel management and a veterinary university in Lakkidi.

Pookode Lake
Pookode Lake is a fresh water lake with boating facility.  It is very popular with tourists coming with children.   The lake is 8.5 hectares big and the maximum depth of the water is 6.5 meters.

Gallery

Climate

See also
 Chundale town
 Kalpetta town
 Meppadi town

References

External links 
 

Villages in Wayanad district
Kalpetta area